The Çarshi Mosque, also known as the Bazaar Mosque and the Taş Mosque (literally, the Stone Mosque) (Albanian: Xhamia e Çarshisë), is the oldest building in Pristina, Kosovo, and it marks the beginning of the old town. The foundation of this mosque was laid out in 1389 during the rule of the Ottoman Sultan Bayezid I and its construction was continued during the reign of Sultan Murad II in the 15th century. The Çarshi Mosque was built to celebrate the Ottoman victory of 1389 in the Battle of Kosovo. Over the years, the mosque has undergone through several restorations. However, its stone-topped minaret has survived for over six centuries (hence, it is often referred to as the Taş Mosque, or the Stone Mosque).

References 

Mosques in Kosovo
Buildings and structures in Pristina
Buildings and structures completed in 1389